The 1957–58 Istanbul Football League was the 33rd season of the league. Galatasaray SK became champions for the 15th time in their history.

League table

Topscorer

References

Istanbul Football League seasons
Turkey
1957–58 in Turkish football